Johan Lilius (1724–1803) was a Finnish justice of the Hovrätt in Åbo, at a time when this court was part of the judicial system of Sweden, and a founding member of the Aurora Society.

Lilius was influential in the development and growth of Finnish literature and contributed  among other things articles to Finland's first newspaper Åbo Tidningar.

See also
Henrik Gabriel Porthan
Lilius family

Sources 
Åbo hofrätts historia intill den 12 nov. 1823, då Hofrätten firade sin andra secular-fest.  Wilhelm Gabriel Lagus. Harvard University library edition.

Helsinki University, baccalaureatus matricula

Finnish jurists
1724 births
1803 deaths
Age of Liberty people
19th-century Swedish judges
18th-century Swedish judges